The 1987 Houston Cougars football team represented the University of Houston during the 1987 NCAA Division I-A football season. The Cougars were led by first-year head coach Jack Pardee and played their home games at the Astrodome in Houston, Texas. The team competed as members of the Southwest Conference, finishing in seventh.

Schedule

Source:

References

Houston
Houston Cougars football seasons
Houston Cougars football